In the 2013–14 season, Al Sadd SC competed in the Qatar Stars League for the 41st season, as well as the Emir of Qatar Cup the Crown Prince Cup and the Champions League.

Squad list
Players and squad numbers last updated on 18 November 2013.Note: Flags indicate national team as has been defined under FIFA eligibility rules. Players may hold more than one non-FIFA nationality.

Competitions

Overview

{| class="wikitable" style="text-align: center"
|-
!rowspan=2|Competition
!colspan=8|Record
!rowspan=2|Started round
!rowspan=2|Final position / round
!rowspan=2|First match	
!rowspan=2|Last match
|-
!
!
!
!
!
!
!
!
|-
| Qatar Stars League

| Matchday 1
| 4th
| 13 September 2013
| 11 April 2014
|-
| Emir of Qatar Cup

| Quarter-final 
| style="background:gold;"| Winner 
| 3 May 2014
| 17 May 2014
|-
| Crown Prince Cup

| colspan=2| Semi-finals
| colspan=2| 19 April 2014
|-
| Champions League

| Group stage
| Round of 16
| 26 February 2014
| 14 May 2014
|-
! Total

Qatar Stars League

League table

Results summary

Results by round

Matches

Emir of Qatar Cup

Crown Prince Cup

AFC Champions League

Group stage

Group D

Knockout stage

Round of 16

Squad information

Playing statistics

|-
! colspan=16 style=background:#dcdcdc; text-align:center| Goalkeepers

|-
! colspan=16 style=background:#dcdcdc; text-align:center| Defenders

|-
! colspan=16 style=background:#dcdcdc; text-align:center| Midfielders

|-
! colspan=16 style=background:#dcdcdc; text-align:center| Forwards

|-
! colspan=16 style=background:#dcdcdc; text-align:center| Players transferred out during the season

Goalscorers
Includes all competitive matches. The list is sorted alphabetically by surname when total goals are equal.

Transfers

In

Out

Notes

References

Al Sadd SC seasons
Qatari football clubs 2013–14 season